Marcus Morton Congdon (May 20, 1844 – September 23, 1920) was an American farmer, cheese manufacturer, and politician from New York.

Life 
Congdon was born on May 20, 1844 in West Clarksville, New York. His parents were assemblyman Anson Congdon and Rachel Lurvey.

Congdon attended Friendship Academy. He lived in Clarksville, where he worked in farming, cheese manufacturing, and oil producing. In 1867, he helped build the first cheese factory in Clarksville. When the Clarksville oil field began developing in 1882, he promoted the drilling of the first oil well in the region. He was also director of the First National Bank of Cuba. He served as town supervisor for five terms.

In 1891, Congdon was elected to the New York State Assembly as a Republican, representing Allegany County. He served in the Assembly in 1892 and 1893.

Congdon married Elma E. Keller in 1865. Their children were Mary R. Hammond, Cassius, Archie D. Gail, and Arson.

Congdon died on September 23, 1920. He was buried in Clarksville Cemetery.

References

External links 

 The Political Graveyard

1844 births
1920 deaths
People from Allegany County, New York
Farmers from New York (state)
Businesspeople from New York (state)
American industrialists
Town supervisors in New York (state)
19th-century American politicians
Republican Party members of the New York State Assembly
Burials in New York (state)